Pat Savage is an Australian former professional rugby league footballer who played for the Brisbane Broncos and Gold Coast Chargers.

Savage, a recruit from the North Queensland region, played at Brisbane as a winger. Most of his first-grade appearances came in the 1992 season and included a two try performance in Brisbane's round eight win over St. George. He lost his place in the side after round 22, with Brisbane going on to win the premiership over St. George in the grand final.

In 1996 he played a season of first-grade with the Gold Coast Chargers.

References

Living people
Australian rugby league players
Rugby league players from Queensland
Brisbane Broncos players
Gold Coast Chargers players
Rugby league wingers
Year of birth missing (living people)